Peter Ryan  is a business journalist working for the Australian Broadcasting Corporation as its chief business and finance correspondent. Ryan was formerly employed as the ABC's Washington bureau chief and head of TV news and current affairs in Melbourne.

Personal life 
Ryan was educated at Marist College Eastwood, a Catholic secondary all-boys school, graduating in 1979.

In 2022, Ryan was awarded the Order of Australia medal, for 'service to the broadcast media as a journalist'.

References

External links 

 
 

Australian business and financial journalists
Living people
Year of birth missing (living people)
Recipients of the Medal of the Order of Australia